The Archdiocese of Madurai is a Latin Church ecclesiastical jurisdiction or archdiocese of the Catholic Church. Its episcopal see the city of Madurai, India.

History
 8 January 1938: Established as the Diocese of Madura from the Diocese of Trichinopoly
 21 October 1950: Renamed as Diocese of Madurai
 9 September 1953: Promoted as Metropolitan Archdiocese of Madurai

Leadership
 Archbishops of Madurai
Archbishop Antony Pappusamy (26 July 2014 – present)
 Archbishop Peter Fernando (22 March 2003 – 26 July 2014)
 Archbishop Marianus Arokiasamy (3 July 1987 – 22 March 2003)
 Archbishop Casimir Gnanadickam, S.J. (3 December 1984 – 26 January 1987)
 Archbishop Justin Diraviam (13 April 1967 – 3 December 1984)
 Archbishop John Peter Leonard, S.J. (19 September 1953 – 13 April 1967)
 Bishops of Madurai 
 Bishop John Peter Leonard, S.J. (later Archbishop) (8 January 1938 – 19 September 1953)

Suffragan dioceses
 Dindigul 
 Kottar
 Kuzhithurai
 Palayamkottai
 Sivagangai
 Tiruchirapalli
 Tuticorin

Gallery

References

External links
 GCatholic.org 
 Catholic Hierarchy 

Roman Catholic dioceses in India
Christian organizations established in 1938
Roman Catholic dioceses and prelatures established in the 20th century
1938 establishments in India
Christianity in Tamil Nadu